Franklin Historic District is a national historic district located at Franklin, Virginia. The district includes 226 contributing buildings and 1 contributing site in the city of Franklin. It includes residential and commercial buildings that were primarily built during the late 19th- and early 20th-century.  Notable resources include the Poplar Springs Cemetery, Camp Family Homestead (c. 1840), the former W.T. Pace Hardware Store, former U.S. Post Office (1916), Franklin Professional Building (1920s), Lyons State Theatre (1930s), Pretlow Peanut Company Warehouses, High Street Methodist Church (1890s), Emmanuel Episcopal / Grace Lutheran Church, and Franklin Elementary School (1922).  Located in the district is the separately listed The Elms.

It was listed on the National Register of Historic Places in 1985, with a boundary increase in 2004.

References

National Register of Historic Places in Franklin, Virginia
Italianate architecture in Virginia
Historic districts on the National Register of Historic Places in Virginia
Buildings and structures in Franklin, Virginia